Maximiliano Martínez (born 10 October 1979) is an Argentine footballer who plays as a forward. He is currently a free agent.

Career
Martínez signed for local side Sarmiento (J) in 2002, subsequently scoring twice in twenty-six professional fixtures as the club finished twentieth overall in the 2002–03 Primera B Metropolitana season. At the conclusion of the aforementioned campaign, Martínez joined Brera of Italy's Terza Categoria. In 2014, Martínez had a spell with Torneo Federal B's Sarmiento (L). Four appearances followed.

Career statistics
.

References

External links

1979 births
Living people
People from Junín, Buenos Aires
Argentine footballers
Association football forwards
Argentine expatriate footballers
Expatriate footballers in Italy
Argentine expatriate sportspeople in Italy
Primera B Metropolitana players
Club Atlético Sarmiento footballers
Brera Calcio players
Sportspeople from Buenos Aires Province